The Diocese of Temotu is one of the nine current dioceses of the Anglican Church of Melanesia, founded in 1981. Three of the diocese's six bishops have gone on to become archbishops of the province.

Temotu Province is the easternmost province of the Solomon Islands. The province was formerly known as Santa Cruz Islands Province. It includes the remote islands Anuta and Tikopia.

List of bishops

References

 
Temotu, Diocese of
Melanesia
Christian organizations established in 1981
1981 establishments in Oceania